Brilhante F.C. was a Brazilian teen drama television series co-produced and broadcast by TV Brasil and Nickelodeon Brazil. It premiered on May 23, 2011 and concluded on August 22, 2011 on TV Brasil, whereas on Nickelodeon it premiered on September 2, 2013 and concluded on September 18, 2013. The series was written by Rodrigo Castilho and Claudio Yosida, with direction being jointly handled by Kiko Ribeiro, Luís Pinheiro and Zaracla. It was produced by Brazilian production company Mixer.

The project was filmed over a period of four months on location at Santa Rita do Sapucaí, Minas Gerais. To serve as a film set, the production company had to elaborate infrastructure within the city, which collaborated with the local economy; jobs were generated through the recruitment of 102 technicians and market professionals, 24 actors and 547 extras.

Brilhante F.C. premiered on TV Cultura on December 1, 2013 and concluded its broadcasting cycle on February 23, 2014.

Plot overview 
Brilhante F.C. revolves around the lives of five young girls who gather up to form the first female soccer team in Santa Rita do Sapucaí, rural zone of Minas Gerais. Together, they cope with the prejudice and the difficulties of dealing with a team without monetary resources and state aid in the middle of an inner city. Meanwhile, each one deal with their own personal problems, such as religion choice, puberty, love relationships, and schoolwork.

Cast and characters

Episodes

References

External links 
 

2011 Brazilian television series debuts
2010s Brazilian television series
Sports telecast series
Portuguese-language television shows
Brazilian drama television series
2011 Brazilian television series endings